Barnabás Rácz (born 26 April 1996) is a Hungarian professional footballer who plays as a midfielder for Nemzeti Bajnokság II club Haladás.

Club career
On 13 August 2021, he signed a one-year contract with Eindhoven in the Netherlands' second-tier Eerste Divisie.

Rácz returned to Hungary on 9 July 2022, joining Nemzeti Bajnokság II club Haladás.

Club statistics

Updated to games played as of 27 June 2020.

References

External links
MLSZ 
HLSZ 

1996 births
Living people
Sportspeople from Szombathely
Hungarian footballers
Hungary youth international footballers
Hungary under-21 international footballers
Association football defenders
Szombathelyi Haladás footballers
Soproni VSE players
Újpest FC players
HSC '21 players
FC Eindhoven players
Nemzeti Bajnokság I players
Nemzeti Bajnokság II players
Hungarian expatriate footballers
Expatriate footballers in the Netherlands
Hungarian expatriate sportspeople in the Netherlands